Panethnicity is a political neologism used to group various ethnic groups together based on their related cultural origins; geographic, linguistic, religious, or 'racial' (i.e. phenotypic) similarities are often used alone or in combination to draw panethnic boundaries. 
The term panethnic was used extensively during mid-twentieth century anti-colonial/national liberation movements.  In the United States, Yen Le Espiritu popularized the term and coined the nominal term panethnicity in reference to Asian Americans, a racial category composed of disparate peoples having in common only their origin in the continent of Asia.

It has since seen some use as a replacement of the term race; for example, the aforementioned Asian Americans can be described as "a panethnicity" of various unrelated peoples of Asia, which are nevertheless perceived as a distinguishable group within the larger multiracial North American society.

More recently the term has also come to be used in contexts outside multiculturalism in US society, as a general replacement for terms like ethnolinguistic group or racial group.

The concept is to be distinguished from "pan-nationalism", which similarly groups related ethnicities but in the context of either ethnic nationalism (e.g. Pan-Arabism, Pan-Celticism, Pan-Germanism, Pan-Iranism, Pan-Slavism, Pan-Turkism, Pan Chinese), or civic nationalism (e.g. Pan-Africanism).

United States

Panethnicity has allowed Asian Americans to unite based on similar historical relations with the US (such as - in some cases - US military presence in their native countries). The Asian American panethnic identity has evolved to become a means for immigrant groups such as Asian Americans to unite in order to gain political strength in numbers. Similarly, one can speak of a "panethnic European American category".
The term "American" has become one of the more widespread panethnic concepts.

Mainstream institutions and political policies often play a big role in the labeling of panethnic groups. They often enact policies that deal with specific groups of people, and panethnic groups are one way to group large numbers of people. Public policy might dole out resources or make deals with multiple groups, viewing them all as one large entity.

Panethnic labels are often, though not always, created and employed by outsiders of the group that is being defined panethnically. In the case of the Asian American Movement of the 1960s and 1970s, the panethnic label "Asian American" was not created by outsiders; rather, it was coined by professor Yuji Ichioka and his spouse, Emma Gee, in order to consolidate Asian activists that they had seen at various political demonstrations of the time. The manner in which the two garnered support for the alliance sheds light on the expressly panethnic approach that was at the core of this new Asian American identity: they went through the roster of the Peace and Freedom Party, a majority white anti-war organization that was protesting the Vietnam War at the time, and telephoned all the individuals they could find with “Asian” surnames.  Though the Asian American identity was initially not inclusive of many Asian ethnicities, new waves of Asian immigrants since the 1965 Immigration and Nationality Act have accelerated the expansion of the identity. At the time of the U.S. Census of 2000, 88% of Asian America was made up of six Asian ethnicities: Chinese, Japanese, Korean, Filipino, Indian, and Vietnamese.

Criticism
The use of "Asian American" as a panethnic racial label is often criticized, due to the term only encompassing some of the diverse peoples of Asia, and for grouping together the racially and culturally different South Asians with East Asians as the same “race”. Americans of West Asian descent, such as the Iranians, Israelis, Lebanese and the Armenians are notably excluded from the term despite Western Asia being geographically part of Asia. As well as West Asians having racial and cultural similarities with South Asians. The common justification for grouping together South and East Asians is because of Buddhism's origins in India, but the religion has "practically died out" in South Asia.

Although the panethnic term refers to Americans of East, Southeast and South Asian ancestry, "Asian American" is usually synonymous for people of East Asian ancestry and or appearance, which has caused some to highlight the general exclusion of Southeast Asians and South Asians.

See also

References

Sources
 
 
 

Ethnicity
Race in the United States